Roman Častulín (born 3 April 1985) is a Slovak footballer who plays as a centre back for FK Dubnica.

Spartak Myjava
He made his Corgoň Liga debut for Spartak Myjava against MŠK Žilina on 13 July 2012. He also scored the first Spartak Myjava Corgoň Liga goal in the 87th minute of the match, which ended in a 1–4 loss against MŠK Žilina.

External links
Spartak Myjava profile 

Eurofotbal.cz profile

References

1985 births
Living people
Sportspeople from Trenčín
Association football defenders
Slovak footballers
AS Trenčín players
Spartak Myjava players
FK Dubnica players
Slovak Super Liga players